Edward S. Osienski is an American politician. He is a Democratic member of the Delaware House of Representatives, representing District 24. He was elected in 2010 after the retirement of Republican William Oberle.

Electoral history
In 2010, Osienski won the Democratic primary with 581 votes (70.9%), and went on to win the general election with 3,531 votes (68.4%) against Republican nominee Abraham Jones.
In 2012, Osienski was unopposed for the general election, winning 7,445 votes.
In 2014, Osienski was unopposed for the general election, winning 3,194 votes.
In 2016, Osienski won the general election with 6,406 votes (68.7%) against Republican nominee Timothy Conrad.
In 2018, Osienski won the general election with 4,989 votes (69.3%) against Republican nominee William W. Dilks, Sr.

References

External links
Official page at the Delaware General Assembly
Campaign site
 

Place of birth missing (living people)
Year of birth missing (living people)
Living people
Democratic Party members of the Delaware House of Representatives
People from New Castle County, Delaware
21st-century American politicians